Merced, California is a city in Merced County, California.

Merced (Spanish for mercy) can also refer to:

Locations

In Merced, California
 Merced College
 Merced County, California
 Merced Falls, California, an unincorporated community in Merced County, California
 Merced Regional Airport
 Merced Theatre (Merced, California)
 University of California, Merced

Other locations
 Merced River in California
 Lake Merced in San Francisco, California
 Merced (district), a district of the San José canton and province of Costa Rica
 Merced metro station, in Mexico City

People 
 Isabela Merced (born 2001), American actress
 Nelson Merced (born 1947), Latino politician and activist 
 Orlando Merced (born 1966), American baseball player
 Wilnelia Merced (born 1957), Puerto Rican beauty queen

Other 
 Merced, the pre-release codename for the original Itanium processor
 Order of Merced, a Catholic order founded in 1218

See also 
La Merced (disambiguation)
Mercedes (disambiguation)